Kuzman Sotirović (16 October 1908 – 25 July 1990) was a Yugoslav football forward. In some sources, he is referred to as Kuzman Sotirovski. He was part of Yugoslavia's team at the 1928 Summer Olympics.

Club career
A player of short stature and medium build, Sotirović usually played as an attacking midfielder where he used his good technical abilities to keep the ball and create scoring chances up front. He first started playing in youth sections at BSK Belgrade, and, after becoming a standard first-team member, won the best championship scorer in 1928, scoring 6 goals in 5 appearances. The very next season he went to France and played for FC Sète and Montpellier SC.

International career
Between 1928 and 1931 Sotirović also played for Yugoslavia national football team. He debuted on 6 May 1928 against Romania and his last game for the national team was on 4 October 1931 against Bulgaria at the Balkan Cup. He is considered to be the first player born on the territory of modern-day North Macedonia to play in the Yugoslav national team.

Personal life
After retirement from football during 1930s, he continued to live in Paris until his death in 1990. He was buried at the Belgrade New Cemetery as per his wish.

Honours
 Yugoslav championship top scorer: 1927

References

External links
 
 
 Kuzman Sotirović - Reprezentacija 

1908 births
1990 deaths
People from Tetovo Municipality
People from Kosovo vilayet
Serbs of North Macedonia
Association football forwards
Yugoslav footballers
Yugoslavia international footballers
Olympic footballers of Yugoslavia
Footballers at the 1928 Summer Olympics
Macedonian footballers
Serbian footballers
OFK Beograd players
FC Sète 34 players
Montpellier HSC players
Yugoslav First League players
Ligue 1 players
Yugoslav expatriate footballers
Expatriate footballers in France
Yugoslav expatriate sportspeople in France
French people of Serbian descent
French people of Macedonian descent
Burials at Belgrade New Cemetery